Anadha is a 1970 Indian Malayalam film,  directed by J. D. Thottan and produced by P. I. M. Kasim. The film stars Prem Nazir, Sheela, Jayabharathi and Kaviyoor Ponnamma in the lead roles. The film has musical score by M. S. Baburaj.

Cast
Prem Nazir
Sheela
Jayabharathi
Kaviyoor Ponnamma
Adoor Bhasi
Kottayam Santha
Sreelatha Namboothiri
T. S. Muthaiah
K. P. Ummer
Meena

Soundtrack
The music was composed by M. S. Baburaj and the lyrics were written by P. Bhaskaran.

References

External links
 

1970 films
1970s Malayalam-language films